Platycryptus californicus is a species of jumping spider in the family Salticidae. It is found in North and Central America.

References

Further reading

External links

 

Salticidae
Articles created by Qbugbot
Spiders described in 1888